Darcy Parish (born 25 July 1997) is a professional Australian rules footballer with the Essendon Football Club in the Australian Football League (AFL).

Early life
Parish was born in Winchelsea, Victoria. He participated in the Auskick program at the local Winchelsea club. He played under 18 football with the Geelong Falcons in the TAC Cup.

Parish was recruited by the Essendon Football Club with the fifth overall selection in the 2015 national draft.

AFL career
Parish was recruited by the Essendon Football Club with the fifth overall selection in the 2015 national draft. He was considered one of the best midfielders in the 2015 draft crop, showing tremendous form averaging 28 disposals at TAC Cup level (16 contested and 12 uncontested), plus seven clearances and five inside-50 entries, showing his all-round quality for the Geelong Falcons. He was named All-Australian in 2014 and backed it up with another selection after the 2015 AFL Under 18 Championships, and was a member of the NAB AFL Academy squad.

He made his debut in the opening round of the 2016 AFL season against  at Metricon Stadium. He was rewarded with a nomination for the 2016 AFL Rising Star after he collected 21 disposals, 13 handball receives, eight tackles, and five inside-50s whilst kicking his first goal in the dying stages to seal a 13-point win against . He played 20 games in his debut season, polling 19 votes to finish fourth in the Ron Evans Medal.

He was played mainly on the wing and as a forward over his first 5 years in the competition. Following a spate of injuries early in 2021 to Essendon midfielders, Parish was moved into the center square, Parish's form suddenly skyrocketed as he became one of the most dominant midfielders in the league, winning best on ground medals in the ANZAC Day match, Dreamtime at the 'G' and the Country Game, the latter two in large defeats. He broke Essendon's all time disposal record against Richmond, was named in the All Australian team, and finished 5th in the Brownlow Medal, recording 26 votes, after only polling in 1 of his 93 games prior.

Statistics
Statistics are correct to the end of the 2021 season

|- style="background-color: #EAEAEA"
! scope="row" style="text-align:center" | 2016
|  || 3 || 20 || 6 || 5 || 149 || 266 || 415 || 69 || 66 || 0.3 || 0.3 || 7.5 || 13.3 || 20.8 || 3.5 || 3.3 || 0
|-
! scope="row" style="text-align:center" | 2017
|  || 3 || 20 || 7 || 6 || 195 || 226 || 421 || 79 || 65 || 0.4 || 0.3 || 9.8 || 11.3 || 21.1 || 4.0 || 3.3 || 0
|-
|- style="background-color: #EAEAEA"
! scope="row" style="text-align:center" | 2018
|  || 3 || 15 || 5 || 9 || 141 || 164 || 305 || 45 || 52 || 0.3 || 0.6 || 9.4 || 10.9 || 20.3 || 3.0 || 3.5 || 0
|-
! scope="row" style="text-align:center" | 2019
|  || 3 || 21 || 12 || 9 || 223 || 210 || 433 || 61 || 80 || 0.6 || 0.4 || 10.6 || 10.0 || 20.6 || 2.9 || 3.8 || 2
|- style="background-color: #EAEAEA"
! scope="row" style="text-align:center" | 2020
|style="text-align:center;"| 
|| 3 || 17 || 7 || 4 || 146 || 180 || 326 || 27 || 52 || 0.4 || 0.2 || 8.6 || 10.6 || 19.2 || 1.6 || 3.1 || 0
|-
! scope="row" style="text-align:center" | 2021
|  || 3 || 23 || 10 || 8 || 341 || 360 || 701 || 96 || 90 || 0.4 || 0.4 || 14.8 || 15.7 || 30.5 || 4.2 || 3.9 || 26
|- class="sortbottom"
! colspan=3| Career
! 116
! 47
! 41
! 1195
! 1406
! 2601
! 377
! 405
! 0.4
! 0.4
! 10.3
! 12.1
! 22.4
! 3.3
! 3.5
! 28
|}

Notes

References

External links

1997 births
Living people
Essendon Football Club players
Geelong Falcons players
Australian rules footballers from Victoria (Australia)